The term Muslim Europe is used for the predominantly Muslim countries of Europe, including Kosovo, Albania, Türkiye, Azerbaijan and Bosnia and Herzegovina; it is also used for the Muslim community in Europe. Islam has had a historical stronghold in the Balkans since the Ottoman wars in Europe.
Islam in Kosovo, 95.6% (2011 census)
Islam in Albania, 58.79% (2011 census)
Islam in Bosnia and Herzegovina, 50.7% (2013 census)

There is a large Muslim diaspora in Europe. The number of Muslims in European countries is estimated at 44 million, or 6% of the total population.

See also
European Islam
List of cities in the European Union by Muslim population

References

Sources

Islam in Europe